The Ministry of Transport of the Czech Republic is a government ministry, which was established in 1969.

Its head office is in Prague 1, in New Town.

References

External links
 

Czech Republic
Transport
Ministries established in 1969
1969 establishments in Czechoslovakia
Transport organizations based in the Czech Republic